Fighter Squadron 111 (VF-111), also known as the Sundowners, was a fighter squadron of the United States Navy. Originally established as Fighter Squadron 11 (VF-11) on 10 October 1942, it was redesignated as VF-11A on 15 November 1946, redesignated as VF-111 on 15 July 1948 and disestablished on 19 January 1959. On 20 January, another squadron, VF-111 (1956-95) then assumed the designation until its de-establishment in 1995. In November 2006, VFC-13 Detachment Key West was redesignated as VFC-111, taking on the Sundowner insignia and callsign.

History
3 distinct Navy squadrons have called themselves ‘Sundowners’.  The U.S. Navy frequently has given the same designation to two or more aviation units, leading to lasting confusion.  Officially, the U.S. Navy does not recognize a direct lineage with disestablished squadrons if a new squadron is formed with the same designation. However, historical tradition within the Naval Aviation community is such that a new squadron will assume the nickname, insignia, and traditions of the earlier squadron(s) with its designation.

World War II

VF-11 was established at NAS North Island California on 10 October 1942 equipped with F4F Wildcats, and on 23 October was on its way to Hawaii. To epitomize its spirit and tactical superiority over the Japanese, the squadron decided it would be called the 'Sundowners' and its insignia depicts two Wildcats shooting down a Rising Sun.

From April to July 1943 VF-11 downed 55 enemy aircraft in aerial combat at Guadalcanal. From then until February 1945 the squadron engaged in strike and air-to-air combat missions resulting in the shoot down of 102 enemy aircraft with dozens more destroyed on the ground. As a direct result of its combat record, the squadron was awarded the Presidential Unit Citation.

1950s

VF-111 was disestablished on 19 January 1959.

On 20 January 1959, Attack Squadron 156 (VA-156) was redesignated as VF-111, thus continuing the Sundowner tradition, but not the unit lineage.  For more information on this later squadron, see VF-111 (1956-95).

Sundowner Aces
 LT Charles R. Stimpson  16;
 LT James E. Swope           10;
 LT Jimmie E. Savage          7;
 LTJG Horace B. Moranville     6;
 LCDR Robert E. Clements   5;
 LTJG Vernon E. Graham         5;
 LT Henry S. White            5;
Other aces who scored kills with the Sundowners were:
LT William N. Leonard, LTJG William J. Masoner, LTJG John A. Zink and Commander Antonio T. Pimentel. CDR Earl G. Clouser.

See also

VF-111 (1956-95)
History of the United States Navy
List of inactive United States Navy aircraft squadrons
List of United States Navy aircraft squadrons

References

 VF-111 History'
 http://thesundowners.org/
 http://www.topedge.com/alley/squadron/pac/vf111his.htm
Bibliography
 Barrett Tillman with Henk van der Lugt.  VF-11/111 Sundowners 1942-95.  Osprey, UK, 2010

Strike fighter squadrons of the United States Navy